Ashley Postelwaite is a former producer who worked in live theatre. She produced Bugs Bunny on Broadway for Warner Bros., where she met Darrell Van Citters. After working with Warner Bros. for another year and a half, Postelwaite and Van Citters formed Renegade Animation in July 1992.

References

American theatre managers and producers
Living people
Year of birth missing (living people)